Brian Linthicum (born November 28, 1987) is a former American football Tight end. He was signed as an undrafted free agent by the New York Jets in 2012. He played college football at Michigan State University.

Early life
He attended St. Anne's-Belfield School in Charlottesville, Virginia. He earned first-team all-state in his senior season. According to Rivals.com, he was ranked 29th among the nation's top tight ends.

College career
He spent his freshman year at Clemson then he transferred to Michigan State before his sophomore season. He played three seasons at Michigan State. In his three years in Michigan State and one year in Clemson, he had 80 receptions, 936 receiving yards and 6 receiving touchdowns.

In his senior year, he was named to the Second-team All-Big Ten. He finished the year with a career high 31 receptions, career high 364 receiving yards but no touchdowns. On September 2, 2011, he recorded 2 receptions for 11 yards against Youngstown State as Michigan State wins 28-6. On September 17, 2011, he had just one reception for 8 yards against Notre Dame but Michigan State loss 31-13. On October 15, 2011, he recorded 2 receptions for 22 yards against 11 ranked Michigan as Michigan State wins 28-14.

In his junior year, he finished the year with 18 receptions, 230 receiving yards and a touchdown. On September 25, 2010, he recorded 3 receptions for 63 yards and a touchdown against Northern Colorado helping Michigan State win 45-7.

In his sophomore year, he was selected to the Academic All-Big Ten. He finished the year with 20 receptions, 266 receiving yards and 2 receiving touchdowns. On September 5, 2009, he recorded 3 receptions for 26 yards and a touchdown against Montana State as Michigan State wins 44-3.

He missed the 2008 season due to transferring from Clemson to Michigan State.

In his freshman year at (Clemson), he finished the year with 11 receptions, 76 receiving yards and 3 receiving touchdowns.   On September 3, 2007, he had one reception for 11 yards and a Touchdown against 19th ranked Florida State as Clemson wins 24-18. On September 8, 2007, he recorded 2 receptions for 23 yards and a touchdown against Louisiana-Monroe as Clemson wins 49-26. On November 3, 2007, he had a 2-yard receiving touchdown with 6:49 minutes left in 4th quarter against Duke 47-10 and by that same score, Clemson wins 47-10.

Professional career

New York Jets
On April 28, 2012, Linthicum signed with the New York Jets as an undrafted free agent. He was waived on July 3, 2012 after suffering a quadriceps injury that rendered him unable to practice at the Jets' mini-camp.

Personal life
His parents are Don and Carla Linthicum. His brother Josh earned four letters as a center on the Bucknell basketball team (2006–09)

External links
 Michigan State Spartans bio
 New York Jets bio

References

1987 births
Living people
American football tight ends
New York Jets players
Michigan State Spartans football players